9000 (nine thousand) is the natural number following 8999 and preceding 9001.

Selected numbers in the range 9001–9999

9001 to 9099
 9001 – sexy prime with 9007
 9007 – sexy prime with 9001
 9009 – centered cube number
 9025 = 952, centered octagonal number
 9029 – Sophie Germain prime
 9041 – super-prime
 9045 – triangular number
 9059 – Sophie Germain prime
 9072 – decagonal number
 9077 – Markov number
 9091 – unique prime

9100 to 9199
 9103 – super-prime
 9126 – pentagonal pyramidal number
 9139 – tetrahedral number
 9175 – smallest (provable) generalized Sierpiński number in base 10:  is always divisible by one of the prime numbers }.
 9180 – triangular number

9200 to 9299
 9216 = 962
 9221 – Sophie Germain prime
 9224 – octahedral number
 9241 – cuban prime of the form x = y + 1
 9261 = 213, largest 4 digit perfect cube
 9272 – weird number
 9283 – centered heptagonal number
 9293 – Sophie Germain prime, super-prime

9300 to 9399
 9316 – triangular number
 9319 – super-prime
 9334 – nonagonal number
 9349 – Lucas prime, Fibonacci number
 9371 – Sophie Germain prime
 9376 – 1-automorphic number
 9397 – balanced prime

9400 to 9499
 9403 – super-prime
 9409 = 972, centered octagonal number
 9419 – Sophie Germain prime
 9439 – completes the twelfth prime quadruplet set
 9453 – triangular number
 9455 – square pyramidal number
 9457 – decagonal number
 9461 – super-prime, twin prime
 9467 – safe prime
 9473 – Sophie Germain prime, balanced prime, Proth prime
 9474 – Narcissistic number in base 10
 9479 – Sophie Germain prime
 9496 – Telephone/involution number

9500 to 9599
 9511 - prime number 
 9521 - prime number 
 9533 - prime number
 9539 – Sophie Germain prime, super-prime
 9551 – first prime followed by as many as 35 consecutive composite numbers
 9587 – safe prime, follows 35 consecutive composite numbers
 9591 – triangular number
 9592 - amount of prime numbers under 100,000

9600 to 9699
 9601 – Proth prime
 9604 = 982
 9619 – super-prime
 9629 – Sophie Germain prime
 9647 – centered heptagonal number
 9661 – super-prime, sum of nine consecutive primes (1049 + 1051 + 1061 + 1063 + 1069 + 1087 + 1091 + 1093 + 1097)
 9689 – Sophie Germain prime
 9699 – nonagonal number

9700 to 9799
 9721 – prime of the form 2p-1
 9730 – triangular number
 9739 – super-prime
 9743 – safe prime
 9791 – Sophie Germain prime

9800 to 9899
 9800 – member of a Ruth-Aaron pair (first definition) with 9801
 9801 = 992, the largest 4 digit perfect square, centered octagonal number, square pentagonal number, member of a Ruth-Aaron pair (first definition) with 9800
 9833 – super-prime
 9839 – safe prime
 9850 – decagonal number
 9855 – magic constant of n × n normal magic square and n-Queens Problem for n = 27.
 9857 – Proth prime
 9859 – super-prime
 9870 – triangular number
 9871 – balanced prime
 9880 – tetrahedral number
 9887 – safe prime

9900 to 9999
 9901 – unique prime, sum of seven consecutive primes (1381 + 1399 + 1409 + 1423 + 1427 + 1429 + 1433)
 9905 – number of compositions of 16 whose run-lengths are either weakly increasing or weakly decreasing
 9923 – super-prime, probably smallest certainly executable prime number on x86 MS-DOS
 9949 – sum of nine consecutive primes (1087 + 1091 + 1093 + 1097 + 1103 + 1109 + 1117 + 1123 + 1129)
 9973 – super-prime
 9999 – Kaprekar number, repdigit

Prime numbers
There are 112 prime numbers between 9000 and 10000:
9001, 9007, 9011, 9013, 9029, 9041, 9043, 9049, 9059, 9067, 9091, 9103, 9109, 9127, 9133, 9137, 9151, 9157, 9161, 9173, 9181, 9187, 9199, 9203, 9209, 9221, 9227, 9239, 9241, 9257, 9277, 9281, 9283, 9293, 9311, 9319, 9323, 9337, 9341, 9343, 9349, 9371, 9377, 9391, 9397, 9403, 9413, 9419, 9421, 9431, 9433, 9437, 9439, 9461, 9463, 9467, 9473, 9479, 9491, 9497, 9511, 9521, 9533, 9539, 9547, 9551, 9587, 9601, 9613, 9619, 9623, 9629, 9631, 9643, 9649, 9661, 9677, 9679, 9689, 9697, 9719, 9721, 9733, 9739, 9743, 9749, 9767, 9769, 9781, 9787, 9791, 9803, 9811, 9817, 9829, 9833, 9839, 9851, 9857, 9859, 9871, 9883, 9887, 9901, 9907, 9923, 9929, 9931, 9941, 9949, 9967, 9973

References 

Integers